Alison Van Uytvanck was the defending champion, but chose not to participate.

Sesil Karatantcheva won the title, defeating Elitsa Kostova in the final, 6–4, 4–6, 7–5.

Seeds

Draw

Finals

Top half

Bottom half

References
Main Draw

Red Rock Pro Open - Singles
2017 Red Rock Pro Open